Ugley Green is a small village in the district of Uttlesford in Essex, England. The village is within the civil parish of Ugley, a smaller settlement  to the north.

The village contains two Grade II listed 19th-century houses, and a post-medieval house.

The village hall was built in 1920. Occupations in 1933 included four farmers, a carpenter, a stationer & sub-postmaster, a blacksmith, a gravel merchant, a beer retailer, a shopkeeper, a steward to Wades Hall, and the licensee of the White Hart public house.

See also
 Clavering hundred
 The Hundred Parishes
 Rude Britain

References 

Villages in Essex
Uttlesford